South Indian Bank Limited (SIB) is a major private sector bank headquartered at Thrissur in Kerala, India. South Indian Bank has 933 branches, 4 service branches, 1 extension counters and 18 Regional Offices spread across India. The bank has also set up more than 1,200 ATMs and 120 Cash Deposit Machines.

History of SIB

South Indian Bank was registered in 1929 under the Companies Act. It commenced business on 29 January 1929 at Round South, Thrissur.

It was included in the second schedule of the Reserve Bank of India and became a scheduled Bank on 7 August 1946. SIB was the first scheduled Bank in the private sector in Kerala to get the license under Section 22 of the Banking Regulation Act, 1949 from the RBI on 17 June 1957.

The Bank has won the 'UiPath Automation Excellence Awards 2021' for Best Automation under crisis for business continuity.

Board of directors
 Salim Gangadharan, Chairman
 Murali Ramakrishnan  - Managing Director & CEO
 Pradeep M. Godbole - Director
 M. George Korah - Director
 Dr. John Joseph - Director
 Francis Alapatt - Director
 Achal Kumar Gupta  - Director
 V. J. Kurian -  Director
 Ranjana Salgaocar - Director
Ram Chandra Saha - Director

See also

 Banking in India
 List of banks in India
 Reserve Bank of India
 Indian Financial System Code
 List of largest banks
 List of companies of India
 Make in India

References

External links

 Official web site
 Interview of Dr. V.A Joseph, Former Managing Director & CEO, South Indian Bank

South Indian Bank
Banks based in Thrissur
Banks established in 1929
Private sector banks in India
Indian companies established in 1928
Indian companies established in 1929
Companies listed on the National Stock Exchange of India
Companies listed on the Bombay Stock Exchange